Noel is a 2004 American Christmas-themed drama film written by David Hubbard and directed by Chazz Palminteri. It stars Penélope Cruz, Susan Sarandon, Paul Walker, Alan Arkin, Daniel Sunjata and an uncredited Robin Williams. It was filmed in Montreal, Quebec, Canada.

Plot
On Christmas Eve in New York, divorced publisher Rose Collins struggles to cope with caring for her mother, an Alzheimer's patient. As she contemplates suicide on a riverbank, former priest Charlie Boyd saves her life, and they spend the night together in her apartment. While Charlie explains that he has lost faith in God, the next morning he tells Rose that his faith has been restored by a telepathic conversation with Rose's mother, claiming that she wants Rose to move on with her life. Rose angrily ejects Charlie from her apartment.

Young couple Nina Vasquez and Mike Riley are on the verge of breaking up due to Mike's increasingly jealous behavior. When Mike attacks a homosexual platonic friend of Nina, she leaves him. When Nina goes to her family to celebrate Christmas there, she meets Rose, who has secretly sneaked into her parents' house, and confides her story to her. Feeling out of place, Rose and Nina go to a nearby bar.

Elderly waiter Artie Venizelos searches for his deceased wife every Christmas. He molests Mike, believing him to be his wife's reincarnation. When Artie collapses and is hospitalized, Mike learns from a colleague that Artie committed manslaughter in a fit of jealousy. As a result, his wife killed herself in a car accident. Mike sees this as a fateful sign that he must overcome his own pathological jealousy.

Jules Calvert is a depressed young man whose sole happy memory is a Christmas celebration in a hospital when he was a teenager. Seeking to repeat the experience, he allows the criminal Arizona to break his hand, only to learn that he cannot revive the past. Rose, feeling guilty over her treatment of Charlie, returns to the hospital and discovers that Charlie is in a coma in the room next to her mother's. Back on the riverbank, Rose decides to enjoy life again, and sets up a date with one of the doctors.

Cast
Susan Sarandon – Rose Collins
Penélope Cruz – Nina Vasquez
Paul Walker – Michael "Mike" Riley
Alan Arkin – Artie Venizelos
Marcus Thomas – Jules Calvert
Chazz Palminteri – Arizona
Robin Williams – Charles "Charlie" Boyd
Sonny Marinelli – Dennis
Daniel Sunjata – Marco
Rob Daly – Paul
John Doman – Dr. Baron
Billy Porter – Randy
Carmen Ejogo – Dr. Batiste
Donna Hanover – Debbie Carmichael
Merwin Mondesir – Glenn

See also
List of Christmas films

References

External links

 
 
 
 

2004 films
2004 directorial debut films
2004 drama films
2000s Christmas drama films
2000s English-language films
American Christmas drama films
Films scored by Alan Menken
Films set in New York City
Films shot in Montreal
2000s American films
Films about disability